Jirdeh (also Romanized as Jīrdeh; also known as Jirdeh Shaft) is a village in Jirdeh Rural District, in the Central District of Shaft County, Gilan Province, Iran. At the 2006 census, its population was 1,476, in 376 families.

References 

Populated places in Shaft County